Ran Ben Shimon is an Israeli footballer.

References

1990 births
Living people
Israeli Jews
Israeli footballers
Association football forwards
F.C. Ashdod players
Hapoel Rishon LeZion F.C. players
Maccabi Ironi Bat Yam F.C. players
Hapoel Bnei Lod F.C. players
Hapoel Ramat Gan F.C. players
Maccabi Kiryat Gat F.C. players
Maccabi Yavne F.C. players
Beitar Tel Aviv Bat Yam F.C. players
F.C. Kafr Qasim players
Maccabi Ironi Ashdod F.C. players
Maccabi Sha'arayim F.C. players
F.C. Ironi Or Yehuda players
Israeli Premier League players
Liga Leumit players
Israeli people of Moroccan-Jewish descent
Footballers from Ashdod